The Wall of Sound was an enormous sound reinforcement system designed in 1973 specifically for the Grateful Dead's live performances. The largest concert sound system built at that time, The Wall of Sound fulfilled lead designer Owsley "Bear" Stanley's desire for a distortion-free sound system that could also serve as its own monitoring system.

History

Stanley and Dan Healy and Mark Raizene of the Grateful Dead's sound crew, in collaboration with Ron Wickersham, Rick Turner, and John Curl of Alembic designed the sound reinforcement system in an effort to deliver high-quality sound to attendees of Grateful Dead concerts, which were drawing crowds of 100,000 or more at the time. The Wall of Sound combined six independent sound systems using eleven separate channels. Vocals, lead guitar, rhythm guitar, and piano each had their own channel and set of speakers. Phil Lesh's bass was piped through a quadraphonic encoder that sent signals from each of the four strings to a separate channel and set of speakers for each string. Another channel amplified the bass drum, and two more channels carried the snares, tom-toms, and cymbals. Because each speaker carried just one instrument or vocalist, the sound was exceptionally clear and free of intermodulation distortion.

Several setups have been reported for The Wall of Sound:

 604 total speakers, powered by 89 300-watt solid-state and three 350-watt vacuum tube amplifiers generating a total of 26,400 watts of power.
 586 JBL speakers and 54 Electro-Voice tweeters, powered by 48 600-watt McIntosh MC-2300 amplifiers generating a total of 28,800 watts of continuous (RMS) power).

Although it was not called a line array at the time, the Wall of Sound was the first large-scale line array used in modern sound reinforcement systems. The Wall of Sound was perhaps the second-largest non-permanent sound system ever built. It can be seen in The Grateful Dead Movie, a documentation of the series of shows played October 16–20, 1974 at the Winterland Ballroom.

There were multiple sets of staging and scaffolding that toured with the Grateful Dead. In order to accommodate the time needed to set up and tear down the system, the band would perform with one set while another would "leapfrog" to the next show. According to band historian Dennis McNally, there were two sets of scaffolding. According to Stanley, there were three sets. Four semi-trailers and 21 crew members were required to haul and set up the 75-ton Wall.

Though the initial framework and a rudimentary form of the system was unveiled at Stanford University's Maples Pavilion on February 9, 1973 (every tweeter blew as the band began their first number), the Grateful Dead did not begin to tour with the full system until a year later. The completed Wall of Sound made its touring debut on March 23, 1974, at the Cow Palace in Daly City, California. A recording of the performance was released in 2002 as Dick's Picks Volume 24.

As Stanley described it,
The Wall of Sound is the name some people gave to a super powerful, extremely accurate PA system that I designed and supervised the building of in 1973 for the Grateful Dead. It was a massive wall of speaker arrays set behind the musicians, which they themselves controlled without a front of house mixer. It did not need any delay towers to reach a distance of half a mile [] from the stage without degradation.

Technical challenges
The Wall of Sound acted as its own monitoring system, and it was therefore assembled behind the band so the members could hear exactly what their audience was hearing. Because of this, Stanley and Alembic designed a special microphone system to prevent feedback. This placed matched pairs of condenser microphones spaced 60 mm apart and wired in reverse polarity from each other. The vocalist sang into the top microphone, and the lower mic picked up whatever other sound was present in the stage environment. The signals were added together using a differential summing amp so that the sound common to both mics (the sound from the Wall) was canceled, and only the vocals were amplified.

The Wall was very efficient for its day, but suffered from more drawbacks than its sheer size. Frequent guest keyboardist Ned Lagin (best known for performing experimental interludes with various permutations of Lesh, Jerry Garcia and drummer Bill Kreutzmann throughout 1974 set breaks) preferred to play through the powerful vocal subsystem (considered to be "the best part of the entire... PA"); however, the group's sound crew often neglected to switch between his quadrophonic input and the vocal input during long sequences, resulting in few of his contributions being recorded. Additionally, as many as two channels of his input would still be lost in the mix when the system was working properly. The Wall's quadraphonic format did not translate well to soundboard tapes made during the period, as the sound was compressed into an unnatural stereo format and suffered from a pronounced tinniness.

Retirement
The rising cost of fuel and personnel, as well as friction among many of the newer crew members and associated hangers-on, contributed to the band's October 1974 "retirement". The Wall of Sound was disassembled, and when the Dead began touring again in 1976, it was replaced with a more logistically practical sound system.

Legacy
On 14 October 2021 during a Sothebys auction called "From the Vault: Property from the Grateful Dead and Friends" several portions of the Wall sold including a portion of the center vocal cluster and a handmade Alembic speaker cabinet for 17,640 USD.  Also sold were multiple McIntosh MC-2300 amplifiers, one sold for 94,500 USD.

References

External links
An Insider's Look at the Grateful Dead's Wall of Sound
Photograph of the Wall of Sound's JBL Professional speakers
Grateful Dead Listening Guide
The Grateful Dead & The Wall of Sound video 

Grateful Dead
Sound production technology
1974 in music